Norwegian banknotes are circulated, in addition to Norwegian coins, with a denomination of Norwegian kroner, as standard units of currency in Norway. From 1877, after the establishment of the Scandinavian Monetary Union, Norwegian banknotes of 1000, 500, 200, 100, 50, 10 and 5 kroner have been put into circulation. The first 200 kroner banknote was first published in 1994. The others have been in use since 1877. Banknotes of 5 and 10 kroner were in use until 1963 and 1983 when they were replaced by coins.
 
From 1917-1925 and 1940-1950 there was a shortage of small change, and 1 and 2 kroner banknotes were printed as "arbitration coins banknotes." The first edition was canceled in 1926, while the second edition was formally valid right up to 1999.

History
From 1877, after the establishment of the Scandinavian Monetary Union, and until the present day, Norwegian banknotes have included 1000, 500, 100, and 50 kroner notes. In 1994 the first 200 kroner note was issued. 5 and 10 kroner notes were also used from 1877, but these were replaced by coins in 1963 and 1983 respectively.

During World War I and World War II and their aftermaths of 1917–1925 and 1940–1950, there was a shortage of change, so 1  krone and 2  kroner notes were printed as "coin notes". The World War I edition was rendered invalid in 1926, whereas the World War II edition technically remained legal tender until 1999.

Current banknotes
The current design of Series VIII was introduced on 30 May 2017, with plans to be fully implemented by the fourth quarter of 2019. The designs are by The Metric System and Snøhetta and use an abstract geometric design influenced by the Beaufort scale.

Series VIII (2017 – present)

Series VIII banknotes are printed by Oberthur Fiduciaire in France. Banknote order quantities

Historical banknotes
All Norwegian notes issued since 1877 are listed below in reverse chronological order. The notes have been issued in series starting with series I in 1877 and going on series VII from 1994. As of 2012 only series VII is in circulation, while series VI is convertible at the central bank until November 1, 2012.

The world wars created a great need for cash. In 1917 a law was passed to allow for 1  krone and 2  kroner "coin notes" in response to a pledge from the Bank of Norway to the Ministry of Finance:
 The board of directors at the Bank of Norway has in writing on the 8th September 1917 informed the Ministry that the shortage of change has now become outright intolerable. One company after another complain that they cannot arrange the agreed salaries for their workers, and the merchants cannot change their customers' banknotes.

Subsequently, coin notes were printed until 1925 but were invalidated already in 1926 when the economy had stabilized after World War I. Coin notes of 1  krone and 2  kroner were also printed during World War II (1940−45) and up until 1950. These were not invalidated after the war. However, the complete series II printed 1901−45 was rendered invalid on 9 September 1945 and those who could not readily justify their amount of cash were only given limited compensation in new money. This was done to diminish the impact of war profiteering.

5 kroner and 10 kroner notes were used from 1877 but were replaced by coins in 1963 and 1983, respectively, based on cost-benefit analyses. Apart from the World War I coin notes in 1926 and the series II notes in 1945, all Norwegian banknotes from series I through series V, including 5 kroner and 10 kroner notes, plus the World War II coin notes, were technically valid – i.e. convertible at the Bank of Norway – all the way until 1998 (series I) and 1999 (series III, IV, V, and the World War II coin notes). The 1000 kroner and 500 kroner notes of series V were valid until 2001 and 2002 respectively.

Series VII (1994-2020)

50 kroner note (outdated)

The 50 kroner note (1997) portrays Peter Christen Asbjørnsen (1812–1885), writer and collector of Norwegian folktales. Since 1999 the serial number has been printed with ultraviolet fluorescence. The previous edition (1984), no longer valid, portrays Aasmund Olavsson Vinje (1818–1879), poet, author, and proponent of Nynorsk. This was the first Norwegian banknote featuring the Nynorsk name of Norway, Noreg (compare with Bokmål: Norge).

The wear and tear on the 50 kroner notes has become so harsh in recent years, possibly from people not regarding them as very valuable any more, so that their maintenance cost is becoming a problem for the Bank of Norway. The 50 kroner note may well be replaced by a 50 kroner coin in the not too distant future.

100 kroner note (outdated)

The 100 kroner note (1997) portrays Kirsten Flagstad (1895–1962), opera singer and first director of the Norwegian National Opera. In 2003 this note was upgraded with a holographic metal foil stripe. The previous edition (1979), no longer valid, was the first Norwegian banknote featuring a woman: Camilla Collett (1813–1895), author, feminist activist, sister of Henrik Wergeland (author and poet), and daughter of Nicolai Wergeland (priest and co-founder of the Norwegian constitution). Camilla actually replaced her brother on the 100 kroner note, where he had been the motif since 1949.

200 kroner note (outdated)

After considerable inflation during the 1970s and 1980s, there was need for a denomination between 100 kroner and 1000 kroner in addition to 500 kroner, and so the first Norwegian 200 kroner note was issued in 1994. It portrays Kristian Birkeland (1867–1917), magnetism researcher, inventor, and co-founder of Norsk Hydro. In 2002 this note was upgraded with a holographic metal foil stripe.

The front of the 200 kroner note shows a portrait of Kristian Birkeland against a stylized pattern of the aurora borealis and a very large snowflake. Birkeland's terrella experiment, which consisted of a small, magnetized sphere representing the Earth suspended in an evacuated box, is shown on the left. When subjected to an electron beam a glow of light would appear around the magnetic poles of the terrella, simulating the aurora.

The back of the 200 kroner note shows a map of the north polar regions including Scandinavia to the right and northern Canada to the left. A ring encircling the magnetic dip pole (located near Resolute, Canada) symbolizes the location of auroral phenomena including the satellite-determined statistical location of Birkeland currents. Birkeland's original depiction of field-aligned currents published in 1908 is shown in the lower right corner.

500 kroner note (outdated)

The 500 kroner note (1999) portrays Sigrid Undset (1882–1949), author and winner of the Nobel Prize in literature in 1927. The note features a holographic metal foil stripe and other security measures. The previous edition (1991), no longer valid, portrays Edvard Grieg (1843–1907), world-renowned national romantic composer and pianist.

The use of the 500 kroner note has increased in recent years, especially after it was introduced to automatic teller machines along with the 200 kroner note. Conversely, the 100 kroner note has been partly displaced from ATMs, and its use has decreased.

1000 kroner note (outdated)

The 1000 kroner note (2001) portrays Edvard Munch (1863–1944), expressionist painter and graphic artist. The note features a holographic metal foil stripe and other security measures. The previous edition (1990), no longer valid, portrays Christian Magnus Falsen (1782–1830), a co-founder of the Norwegian constitution.

The most valuable Norwegian banknote has always been the 1000 kroner note, but its value has been decimated during the years. In 100 years from 1904 to 2004 the value of 1000 kroner has decreased 55−fold, from more than 4000 loaves of bread to less than 70 loaves. (The price of a bread in 2004 was approximately 15 kroner, and the consumer price index in said period increased from 2.0 to 113.3.)

Series VI (1979–2001)

Series V (1962-1985)

Series IV (1948-1976)

Series III (1945-1955)

"Coin notes" (1940-1950)

Series II (1901-1945)

"Coin notes" (1917-1925)

Series I (1877–1901)

Source: Bank of Norway

References

External links

 Information on Norwegian banknotes (Bank of Norway)

Norwegian krone
Currencies of Norway